Heinz Kunert (25 March 1927, Sarnów, Gliwice County – 6 April 2012) was a German engineer and inventor.

Life 
Kunert studied philosophy, physics and psychology at University of Bonn. Kunert invented the first rear defogger for automobiles. From 1957 until 1992, he worked in Cologne for company Sekurit Glas-Union GmbH.

References

External links 
 Oeko-Logic:Erfinder Heinz Kunert 

1927 births
2012 deaths
Engineers from North Rhine-Westphalia
20th-century German inventors
University of Bonn alumni